Cainon Renard Lamb (born March 22, 1978), professionally known as Lamb or Lamb Litty, is an American record producer and songwriter from Miami, Florida. He has worked with the likes of Beyoncé, SWV, Missy Elliott, Monica, Keyshia Cole and Jazmine Sullivan. In 2017, Lamb made his rapping debut on colleague Missy Elliott's single "I'm Better".

Biography

Early life 
A native of Miami, Florida, Lamb's involvement with music started in the church, as a drummer in the church band. As a youth, Lamb continued to develop his musical talents and excelled in sports, particularly football. He earned a full scholarship to Florida A&M University and became an All-American wide receiver for the FAMU Rattlers football team. During his college years, Cainon Lamb was given an MPC aka "Beat Machine" as a gift from his late mother Regina T. Lamb. He utilized his musical background to create music for his local gospel rap group called Against da Grain.

After graduating with a bachelor's degree in Criminal Justice, Lamb went on to play professional arena football with the Tallahassee Thunder and Florida Firecats. During his Firecats tenure as a record-breaking wide receiver, Lamb and his team won the ArenaCup Championship in 2004.

Music career 

In 2004, Lamb's music caught the ear of Grammy Award-winning artist/producer/songwriter Missy Elliott who was given a beat CD through Lamb's affiliation with Elliott's Goldmind artist Lil Brianna. That same beat CD contained a track which became Lamb's first major song placement—American Idol winner Fantasia Barrino's 2004 debut album Free Yourself.

After retiring from football in late 2005, Lamb and Elliott went on to work with artists that included Monica, Ruben Studdard, Fantasia, Missy Elliott, Keyshia Cole, Jazmine Sullivan, Trina and Jagged Edge.

In 2007, Lamb produced his first #1 record with Keyshia Cole's Grammy-nominated single "Let It Go". In 2008, Lamb went on to produce "Need U Bad"—Jazmine Sullivan's chart-topping debut single. He also produced "Holding You Down (Goin' in Circles)", the lead single from Jazmine's sophomore effort—Love Me Back. In addition to producing songs on Monica's 5th studio album The Making of Me, in 2010 Lamb produced 3 songs for Monica's 6th studio album Still Standing. While producing Monica's #1 hit single "Everything to Me", Lamb made his television debut on the December 8, 2009 episode of Monica's BET reality television show "Still Standing".

In 2011, Lamb started his own company—Lambo Music Group.

In the same year he co-produced the track "Countdown" by Beyonce, which peaked at #1 on the Billboard Dance Club/Play Songs Chart. In an interview with Leslie Moore, Lamb revealed, "I was in the studio, and I was listening to Boyz II Men. The song, “Uhh Ahh” starts with a countdown of '10, 9, 8, 7, 6, 5, 4, 3, 2, 1'..." Lamb added his own touches to the sample and started a beat. Lamb's sent the song over to his publisher Big Jon Platt who played the track for Beyonce. "[Platt] told me Beyonce started bouncing up and down, dancing when the countdown came on. She started dancing, bouncing, moving all kind of ways."

2017 opened with Lamb making his first rapping debut on colleague Missy Elliott's single "I'm Better".

In 2018 Lamb also known as Lamb Litty stepped from behind producing and penning hits for several major artist, he released his own music as a solo independent artist with songs like “Tru Luv” Lamb sings the lyrics “I wanna dip in ya water on the deep end, and it’s Litty ya Callin while I’m deep in” confessing his love for a woman all while rapping over “a Bop” Beat that is colorful with high energy. With songs like “Ya Birthday” Lamb sings “It’s Ya Birthday” to an uptempo party soulful beat that’s a fun birthday song. He flows metaphors like “And Now we sip Lemonade Like Beyoncè” as he gives a nod to Bey’s 2016 Album release “Lemonade” in which Beyoncè used a piece of a song Lamb Produced for her called “Countdown” in the middle of her song called “Hold Up”. All 6 of his songs were released on All Steaming Platforms and received great response’s as he continues to build his fanbase as a recording artist!

In late 2019 Lamb moved his production skills over into the Latin music marking with a Hit single by: Ozuna Feat. Diddy & DJ Snake called “Eres Top”. Lamb and his production partner Bigg D has broken genre boundaries with the hit song sampling “I Need a Girl Part 2” by: P. Diddy Featuring from Ginuwine, Loon, Mario Winans and Tammy Ruggeri. Where the producers made Hip-Hop/R&B meet reggaetone. The song is the first single on Ozuna’s Sony Music Entertainment new Album release “Nibiru”.

In 2020 Lamb and Bigg D Signed New Artist Rapper Love and Hip-Hop Miami and Social Media Star Sukihana under their production company 12th and Collins Ent.

Discography

2004
 Fantasia — Free Yourself
 04. "Selfish (I Want You to Myself)" (co-produced by Missy Elliott)

2006
 Fantasia — Fantasia
 08. "I'm Not That Type" (co-produced by Missy Elliott)
 10. "Two Weeks Notice" (co-produced by Missy Elliott)
 13. "Sunshine" (co-produced by Harold Lilly)

 Monica — The Makings of Me
 06. "Doin' Me Right" (co-produced by Missy Elliott & Miguel "Pro" Castro)
 07. "Raw"

 Ruben Studdard — The Return
 09. Ain't No Party

2007
 Keyshia Cole — Just like You
 01. "Let It Go" (featuring Lil' Kim & Missy Elliott) (co-produced by Missy Elliott) #1 for 8 weeks on the Billboard R&B/Hip-Hop Chart; #7 on the Billboard Hot 100

2008
 Step Up 2: The Streets (soundtrack)
 02. "Shake Your Pom Pom"
 08. "Ching-a-Ling" (co-produced by Missy Elliott)

 Jazmine Sullivan — Fearless
 02. "Need U Bad" (co-produced by Missy Elliott) #1 for 8 weeks on the Billboard R&B/Hip-Hop Songs Chart
 08. "Dream Big" (co-produced by Missy Elliott)

2009
 Crystal Aikin — Crystal Aikin
 06. "Love Him"

 Billy Blue — Trap Certified (mixtape)
 22. "Story of My Life"

2010
 Monica — Still Standing
 03. "Everything to Me" (co-produced by Missy Elliott) #1 for 8 weeks on the Billboard R&B/Hip-Hop Songs Chart
 06. "If You Were My Man" (co-produced by Missy Elliott)
 11. "Blackberry" (co-produced by Missy Elliott) [bonus track]

 Jazmine Sullivan — Love Me Back
 01. "Holding You Down (Goin' In Circles)" (co-produced by Missy Elliott) #3 for 8 weeks on the Billboard R&B/Hip-Hop Songs Chart
 07. "Excuse Me" (co-produced by Missy Elliott)

 Flo Rida Only One Flo (Part 1)
 09. "Momma"
  Puzzle (promo single)

 Trina — Amazin'
 10. Always (featuring Monica)

2011
 Beyoncé — 4
 09. "Countdown" (co-produced by Beyoncé Knowles, Shea Taylor) #1 on Billboard Dance Club/Play Chart

 Brianna — Face Off (mixtape)
 03 — "I'm Super (Kim)"
 05 — "Marilyn Monroe"

 Jagged Edge — The Remedy
 03. "Baby"
 06. "I Need A Woman"

 Git Fresh — Eat It Up (mixtape)
 04. "She Be Like"

 Isaac Carree — Uncommon Me
 13. "Navigation"

2012
 SWV — I Missed Us
 01 "Co-Sign"
 02. "All About You"
 03. "Show Off"
 04 "Everything I Love"
 05. "Do Ya" (featuring Brianna Perry)
 06. "The Best Years"
 07. "I Missed Us"
 08. "Better Than I"
 09. "Keep You Home"

 Monica — New Life
 01. "New Life (Intro)"
 05. "Big Mistake"
 08. "Until It's Gone" (co-produced by Missy Elliott)
 12. "New Life (Outro)"
 13. "Breathe" (co-produced by Ray Ray)
 14. "In 3D"
 16. "Anything (To Find You)" (featuring Rick Ross) (co-produced by Missy Elliott)

 Mandy Capristo — Grace
 01. "Allow Me"

2014
 Missy Elliott — Block Party
 00. "Rather" (co-produced by Missy Elliott)

2015
 Jay Burna — TBA
 00. "Mood" (co-produced by Bigg D)

2017
 Missy Elliott — TBA
 00. "I'm Better" (featuring Lamb)

2018
 City Girls — Period (mixtape)
 02. "Take Yo Man" (co-produced by Bigg D)
 06. "Where The Bag At" (co-produced by Bigg D)

 DJ Nasty 305 — I Like
 00. "I Like (featuring Lamb Litty, Ball Greezy, Tory Lanez & Mike Smiff)"

2019
 PJ — One Missed Call
 00. "One Missed Call"

 PJ — My Best Life
 00. "My Best Life"

 Ball Greezy — I'm In Love
 00. "I'm In Love"

References

Living people
Record producers from Florida
Hip hop record producers
1978 births
Tallahassee Thunder players
Florida Firecats players
Florida A&M Rattlers football players
Musicians from Miami
Players of American football from Miami